MTV Roadies 5.0 is the fifth season of MTV Roadies, a reality television show aired on MTV India. The show was created by Raghu Ram and is hosted by Rannvijay. "Roadies has travel, adventure, drama, touch of voyeurism..." said Raghu Ram, when asked about the show.

Selection procedure
Auditions are held in various major cities in India. People who turn up for the audition are made to undergo a group discussion, following which, selected candidates are chosen for personal interview conducted by Raghu Ram and Nikhil Chinapa. The interview round is deliberately acrimonious to test the participant's attitude, tolerance and patience levels. In the first two seasons, 7 Roadies were selected. Since then, this number has been increased to 13. There is no limit as to how many times a person can audition.

Format
The selected thirteen Roadies are given Hero Honda Karizma bikes to travel on a pre-decided route. Each episode features a vote-out at the end in which the roadies eliminate one of their fellow roadie, thereby decreasing the number of roadies carrying on with the journey.

Each episode consists of number of tasks or challenges which they have to perform. These tasks can be either "Money tasks" or "Immunity tasks". In the "Money tasks", the roadies add cash to their account on successful completion of these tasks while in "Immunity tasks", the team which wins gets Immunity. The team which attains Immunity becomes safe from vote-out i.e. its members cannot be voted-out in that episode. The above-mentioned tasks are either team-based (i.e. performed between two or more teams) or individual-based (i.e. performed one-on-one). At the end of scheduled journey, the last roadie who survives till the end is declared the winner and walks away with the total cash accumulated by performing the money tasks.
The fifth season is the first time when an advantage task is introduced. The winner/s of an advantage task get(s) some advantage in the vote out, which may include multiple votes or being the only one(s) to vote in the vote-out.

The Indian version of the show is very slightly inspired by the MTV-USA reality show Road Rules (a spinoff of The Real World) which started in the year 1995.

Contestants
 1. Varun 
 2. Prabhjot 
 3. Vibhor 
 4. Ayaz 
 5. Ankita (simran)
 6. Shambhavi 
 7. Anmol 
 8. Vikrant 
 9. Ankita
 10. Sonel Singh
 11. Aashutosh Kaushik, winner
 12. Nihal 
 13. Snehashish

Episode summary

Episode 1
The roadies begin their journey from Goa. Here, they are divided into two teams and are asked to compete in a banana boat race. After the task, the roadies reach for a vote-out to eliminate a contestant amongst them. However, to everyone's surprise, Raghu makes an appearance and declares that a double vote will take place. In this episode, Simran and Varun are voted out.

Episode 2
The roadies begin their journey after being flagged-off by previous season finalists, Anthony and Bani. The roadies proceed to Belgaum where they are asked to perform Mallakhamb (yogic asanas on a pole) for their money task. For their immunity task, the roadies are divided into teams of two members each — one male and one female. They then participate in a quiz, in which each team is asked a question and only girls are allowed to answer. Every wrong answer would require the male member of the team to take-off one item of clothing from his body or quit the quiz. Anmol and Vikrant win this quizzing round and get immunity. In the vote-out, Vibhor gets voted-out.

Episode 3
After Vibhor's vote out, the group dynamics of Delhi gang changed. A new group of Snehashish, Prabhjyot, and Ankita formed. Nihal is chosen as captain of the day. During the journey Ayaz and Shambhavi met with an accident.  
In the next money task roadies contestants went to village. The task was to make the sugarcane juice from a machine. After Vibhor's vote out the closeness between Nihar and Shambhvai increased. In the next immunity task Prabhjyot, Vikrant, Sonel, and Shehashish won the immunity by winning the boating task. Also Shambhavi got an advantage and she got injured because of other roadies. Vikrant plotted against Ayaz and tried convincing all voted against Ayaz, Shambhavi also supported Vikrant. But at the vote out twist came in and only immune roadies were allowed to vote. In this vote out Prabhjyot, Snehashish, Sonel voted out Vikrant.

Episode 4
For the money task, the roadies are asked to play tennis with a professional. For each point they scored, they won 5000.
The roadies were divided into groups of three and each group had to perform a contemporary dance, depicting the fairy tale assigned to them. Sonel, Nihal and Prabhjot performed this task well and won immunity. However, during the vote-out, Raghu made an appearance and gave the non-immune roadies a chance to try their luck on a roulette table. Shambhavi won the immunity and was given the power to replace any one of the immune members. She chose Prabhjot. The vote-out was held and Snehashish was voted out of the show.

Episode 5
The eight roadies were divided into two teams for their immunity task. They were required to hang upside-down on a trapeze and pass wooden log pieces from one side to another. In this task, both the teams passed one log each neither team got immunity. In the vote out, the Roadies were told that if there were a tie between any two Roadies in getting the highest number of votes against them, then both those roadies would become safe from elimination. Prabhjot & Anmol both garnered four votes each and were safe from elimination. A second round of vote-out was held and Ankita was eliminated.

Episode 6
In this episode, Ashutosh and Sonel meet with an accident. Both suffer minor injuries. For the money task, the roadies had to hang upside down and transfer water from the container in the floor to the one at a height. Prabhjot was chosen captain for immunity task along with co-captain Shambhavi and none of the teams were able to get immunity. Ashutosh was not chosen by either of the captains. The roadies had to perform a Bowl-out as an immunity task. In this task, none of the teams manage to win immunity. In the vote out, due to the virtue of his non-participation, Ashutosh is given the power to grant immunity to either of the teams. Ashutosh decides to grant immunity to Shambhavi's team and as a result, Prabhjot is voted out unanimously.

Episode 7 and 8
In this two-part episode, titled "Big Bang episode" the roadies reach their last destination in India –Chennai, before they can head to Thailand and Malaysia. Here, the existing roadies, namely Sonel, Nihal, Ashutosh, Anmol, Shambhavi and Ayaaz confront the previously voted out roadies- Ankita Bajaj, Vikrant, Prabhjot, Vibhor and Snehashish. At this point, Raghu makes an entry and states that only deserving roadies would go abroad. He gives the eliminated roadies a chance to challenge any existing roadie for a one-on-one challenge. Raghu declares that the winner of the challenge will go abroad. For the challenges, Prabhjot challenges Anmol, Ankita Bajaj challenges Shambhavi, Snehashish challenges Ashutosh & Vikrant is pitted against Nihal.

In the first task, the two opposing roadies are made to stand on two wooden planks, halted 30 feet above the ground. Each roadie is provided with an axe to chop off the other's plank. In this task, Prabhjot and Nihal manage to chop off the plank of their opponents respectively. In the second task, each opponent has to hang on a water hose, with water falling over their head. The water pressure is increased slowly till it reaches 110 psi. The person who can withhold the water pressure for the longest time, wins the task. Shambhavi and Ashutosh win their tasks respectively.

With Shambhavi, Ashutosh, Nihal and Prabhjot booking their places for the next stage, . A vote-out is held to eliminate a roadie from these three and in the process, Ayaaz is voted out. So the final six roadies heading to Thailand are Shambhavi, Ashutosh, Nihal, Prabhjot, Sonel and Vibhor.

Episode 9
The roadies reach Bangkok. Here, they are joined by Ankita (aka Simran) and Varun, both voted-out in the first episode. Here the roadies have to perform a money task in a club becoming ladyboys. They perform and earn Rs. 40,000. After this they participated in an immunity task in the floating market where they have to buy as many items as they can, from a list of items, within a cash limit of 300 baht. The vote-out results in a tie between Shambhavi & Nihal, with Shambhavi being voted out eventually.

Episode 10
The roadies reach Hua Hin. The money task required the roadies to eat locusts, squid, water snake, and frogs which are considered local delicacies. Barring Ashutosh, who is a vegetarian, everybody performs this task. There was no immunity task, but an advantage task, in which roadies had to learn Muay Thai (kickboxing) and fight among themselves. Prabhjot, Sonel, Varun and Vibhor win the advantage task. The winners of the advantage task get to vote twice in the vote-out. In the vote-out, Varun gets voted out.

Episode 11
The roadies reach Phuket. Here, the  roadies face a money task which requires them to balance on a barrel placed in front of a huge hurricane fan. Later in the episode, the roadies are called for a vote-out and asked to vote for the person who they feel, deserves to get immunity. In this, Nihal, Sonel, Ashutosh and Prabhjot get the votes and Vibhor and Simran, who get no votes, are left to fight for the fifth place by participating in an immunity task. The immunity task requires Vibhor and Simran to do a tightrope walk, in which the person covering the maximum distance is judged the winner. In this task, Simran covers more distance on the rope than Vibhor, thus leading Simran to be declared the fifth roadie.

Episode 12
The roadies reach Malaysia. Here they participate in a money task, which requires them to balance on a wakeboard. While, Ashutosh and Sonel fail to balance on the wakeboard, Nihal balances for 1 second while Prabhjot and Simran do so for 3 and 9 seconds respectively. Later, they proceed to a workshop where perform a task. The winner of this task gets neither immunity nor advantage but wins a Hero Honda Karizma bike. Simran wins the "Karizma bike" by performing the fastest in the task. During the vote out, Rannvijay brings a twist in show by offering two choices to the winner of the Karizma (In this case, Simran). She is given an option wherein she can pick any roadie to be voted out but with a condition that she will have to give away her Karizma bike to the voted out roadie. The other option being, Simran keeps her Bike, but the other roadies choose someone amongst them, who will later vote-out a roadie. In this, Ashutosh wins the vote and gets to decide as to who gets voted-out. Ashutosh chooses Prabhjot and she gets voted out.

Episode 13
The roadies reach Port Dickson for their final money task, which requires them to ride ostriches. The roadies earn Rs twenty-one thousand in this task and their final prize money tally reaches Rs 2,30,000. After completing their money task, the roadies proceed for their immunity task which involves a traditional Chinese acrobatic sport Chinguay, in which the roadies have to balance a huge flagpole on their forehead. In this, Nihal manages to balance the pole for longer duration than other roadies and hence gets immunity. In the vote-out, Simran is voted out.

Episode 14 and 15
This episode in Malaysia will decide the finalist and would be crowned the winner of Season 5.0. At this moment, Nihal and Ashutosh were asked to choose five members each from the eliminated . Sonel was barred from participating in this final task.

In the second part of the finale, Raghu swapped the teams selected by the finalists. The teams were then required to perform five tasks :-
 Kiss an iguana
 Shave your head
 Remove all clothes
 Get two nipple piercings or a tongue piercing
 Get slapped by the opposing team leader.
The finalist whose team performed the most number of tasks was declared to be the winner. The two finalists themselves were forbidden from performing the tasks but were expected to convince their teammates to perform the tasks for them. However, both teams performed all the tasks within their stipulated time and Sonel got to decide the winner by performing a task and declaring the name of a winner. Sonel kissed the iguana and declared Ashutosh as the winner.

References

External links
 Roadies official website
 Roadies Fan Website

MTV Roadies
2007 Indian television seasons
2008 Indian television seasons